Labroides bicolor is a species of wrasse endemic to the Indo-Pacific, Indian Ocean and Pacific Ocean and is known by various names including bicolor cleanerfish, bicolor cleaner wrasse, bicolored cleaner wrasse, bicolour cleaner wrasse, cleaner wrasse, two-colour cleaner wrasse and yellow diesel wrasse.

Description

Although the IUCN said both males and females are not dimorphic and have the same color pattern, other sources say the male is black with light color in the back of the body and the female is gray with black while the juvenile is yellow and black.

Distribution and population
The countries that it occurs includes American Samoa, Australia, British Indian Ocean Territory, China, Christmas Island, Cocos Islands, Comoros, Cook Islands, Fiji, French Polynesia, Guam, India, Indonesia, Japan, Kenya, Kiribati, Madagascar, Malaysia, Maldives, Marshall Islands, Mauritius, Mayotte, Micronesia, Mozambique, Myanmar, Nauru, New Caledonia, Niue, Northern Mariana Islands, Oman, Palau, Papua New Guinea, Philippines, Réunion, Samoa, Seychelles, Singapore, Solomon Islands, Somalia, South Africa, Taiwan, Tanzania, Thailand, Tokelau, Tonga, Tuvalu, United States Minor Outlying Islands, Vanuatu, Vietnam, Wallis and Futuna and Yemen.

Given its wide range, the exact population is unknown but is considered relatively common except in the Philippines and Malaysia where it is rare in some sites.

Habitat and ecology

It is found in abundant coral areas from sub-tidal reef flats to deeper lagoons and seaward reefs and has a depth of 40 meters. Unlike other cleaner wrasses, this fish spans larger areas to clean and is cleans more during the day when it is active. It feeds on crustacean ectoparasites such as gnathiidae and fish mucus and, both individually and in groups, it will also clean sharks and rays such as grey reef shark, whitetip reef shark; Labroides bicolor will also clean other. At night, it may sleep in a mucous cocoon.

It is found to interact with 36 species including Striated surgeonfish, Acanthurus nigrofuscus, parrotfish and its cousin bluestreak cleaner wrasse. Like other cleaners, Labroides bicolor will dance as a form of communication and may also dance to reduce client aggression.

Conservation
Harmless to humans, it is listed as Least Concern by the IUCN and it not considered to be significantly threatened although it was once was targeted by the aquarium and coral degradation may occur in some parts of its range. It occurs in several protected areas throughout its range but research is needed on sustainable harvest and trade and the impact of collection.

References

External links

FishBase profile
 

bicolor
Fish of Palau
Fish of Thailand
Taxa named by Henry Weed Fowler
Taxa named by Barton Appler Bean
Fish described in 1928